Vortis may refer to:

 Vortis (Doctor Who), a fictional planet in the British science fiction series Doctor Who
 Vortis, an indie rock band including drummer Jim DeRogatis
 Tokushima Vortis, a professional soccer club in Japan
 The Red Shiny Robots of Vortis appear in the TV series Hyperdrive

See also
Fortis (disambiguation)